"Fuckin' 'Ell It's Fred Titmus" is a song by UK indie band Half Man Half Biscuit. It was on the 1985 album Back in the DHSS, and the 1988 CD ACD. The subject of the song was cricketer Fred Titmus.

The band line-up for both the album track and the live recording was Paul Wright on drums, Neil Crossley on bass guitar and vocals, Nigel Blackwell on rhythm guitar and lead vocals, Simon Blackwell on lead guitar and David Lloyd on keyboards.

Release and performances
In 1985, the band released an album entitled Back in the DHSS. This was the second track on Side A of the album, following "God Gave Us Life" and preceding "Sealclubbing", "99% Of Gargoyles Look Like Bob Todd" and "Time Flies By (When You're A Driver Of A Train)". In 1988, the group produced their first compact disc, and a live version of "Fuckin' 'Ell" featured as track number 14, following "Architecture And Morality, Ted And Alice (live)" and preceding "Time Flies By (When Your The Driver Of A Train) (live)". The track was recorded at The Leadmill in Sheffield.

The track is often performed as the opening live number, such as at The Point, Cardiff in 2007, and at Coronation Hall, Ulverston, Cumbria in 2008. The track has been described as one of the highlights of their "quintessentially British" live performance.

Contents and style

The song describes the singer's surprise at encountering the famous cricketer in three everyday situations - at a supermarket, in a park, and at a railway station.  As with other songs by Half Man Half Biscuit, it includes elements of British popular culture and puns. Reference is made to Lenor, a brand of fabric conditioner, and a double entendre concerns American singer Stevie Nicks, and the British slang term "nick", meaning to steal, in the sense of a kleptomaniac.

Origin
Lead singer Nigel Blackwell said of the song, "To be honest, when I started writing songs one of my fantasies ... perhaps too strong a term that but y'know ... was to have a load of folk shouting something ridiculous like 'Fucking Hell, it's Fred Titmus!' back at the stage as a counterblast to all those rock acts whose audience would hold their lighters aloft during some Godforsaken dross concerning 'a girl no longer with us due to flagrant disregard of the speed limit by persons unknown'. Much more fun thought I to have 'em shouting the name of a Middlesex spin bowler. Certainly more believable anyway, I think." In another interview, Blackwell explained the idea behind such songs. He said that, after leaving school at the age of 15, he "could either have become a heroin addict - de rigueur around here at that time - or amused myself in some other way. This, I suppose, was that 'other way' - writing songs that reflected my lifestyle." Blackwell said that he had too much time on his hands, and watched a lot of daytime television. He would "think up stupid incidents with K-list personalities."

He went on to state that the described incident never occurred; "I have never met Fred Titmus, for example, let alone greeted him in such an overfamiliar way."

Cultural influence
The subject of the song was Fred Titmus, the former Middlesex and England cricket player. It has been described as "The funniest song ever written about an England and Middlesex cricketer". Other modern tracks about the game include Manic Street Preachers B-side "Mr Carbohydrate", which references Matthew Maynard, and I-Roy's tribute to Michael Holding.

It has featured in several readers suggestion polls, such as The Guardian newspaper's request for readers to suggest songs about famous people, and the BBC's Test Match Special, when listeners were invited to e-mail in their favourite 'cricketing songs'.

References

Sources

External links 
The Half Man Half Biscuit Home Page
This song, at the Half Man Half Biscuit lyrics project

1985 songs
Half Man Half Biscuit songs